Marion Krijgsman (born 8 March 1973) is a Dutch former competitive figure skater. She is the 1999 Crystal Skate of Romania bronze medalist and a four-time Dutch national champion. She competed at ten ISU Championships, achieving her best result, 17th, at the 1991 and 1999 Europeans.

Personal life 
Krijgsman was born on 8 March 1973 in Haarlem. During her skating career, she resided in Leek, Groningen.

Career 
Krijgsman ranked 19th at the 1990 World Junior Championships in Colorado Springs, Colorado. She placed 17th at her first major senior international, the 1991 European Championships in Sofia, Bulgaria.

In the 1991–92 season, Krijgsman was training 20 hours a week, of which 18 hours was spent on the ice. She finished 22nd at the 1992 Europeans in Lausanne, Switzerland; 22nd at the 1993 Europeans in Helsinki, Finland; 22nd at the 1998 European Championships in Milan, Italy; and 17th at the 1999 European Championships in Prague, Czech Republic. She won four national titles.

As of October 2016, Krijgsman is a skating coach at Deventer IJsclub in Deventer, Netherlands. She is also an ISU technical specialist.

Results

References

External links
results

Navigation

1973 births
Living people
Dutch female single skaters
People from Leek, Netherlands
20th-century Dutch women
21st-century Dutch women
Sportspeople from Groningen (province)